Gordon Henry may refer to:

 Gordon Henry (Royal Navy officer) (died 1855), British admiral and mayor of Bath
 Gordon Henry (poet) (born 1955), poet and fiction writer
 Gordon Henry (footballer) (1930–2007), Scottish football centre half
 Gordon Henry (ice hockey) (1926–1972), ice hockey goaltender
 Gordon Henry (rower) (born 1954), Canadian Olympic rower